Life of a Thoroughbred is a 1941 American short documentary film directed by Tom Cummiskey. Its subject was horse racing. It was part of Adventures of the Newsreel Cameraman, a series of documentary shorts produced by 20th Century Fox. It was nominated for an Academy Award for Best Documentary Short.

References

External links

1941 films
American short documentary films
American black-and-white films
20th Century Fox short films
1941 documentary films
Black-and-white documentary films
1941 short films
1940s short documentary films
1940s English-language films
1940s American films